Rosa 'Seashell',  (aka KORshel),  is a salmon-pink hybrid tea rose cultivar, bred by Reimer Kordes in Germany before 1976. The rose was introduced into the United States by Jackson & Perkins in 1976. The cultivar was named an All-America Rose Selections winner in 1976.

Description
'Seashell' is a tall vigorous shrub, up to 4 ft (90 cm) in height with  a 3 ft (90 cm) spread. Petals open almost flat and are typically 4 inches (10 cm) in diameter, with a medium-double bloom form of 17-25 petals.  Flowers are orange when they first open, before turning a salmon-pink color, and finally fading to pale apricot pink. The rose has a mild fragrance. The flowers are borne singly and have a long bloom time. 'Seashell' is a disease resistant plant and thrives in USDA zone 4 and warmer.  The foliage is large, healthy and dark green.

Awards
 All-America Rose Selections winner, USA, (1976)

See also
Garden roses
Rose Hall of Fame
List of Award of Garden Merit roses

Notes

References

Seashell